Harrisburg is a city in Poinsett County, Arkansas, United States. The population was 2,288 at the 2010 census. It is included in the Jonesboro, Arkansas Metropolitan Statistical Area. The city is the county seat of Poinsett County.

Geography
Harrisburg is located at  (35.564123, -90.722152) on Crowley's Ridge.

Demographics

2020 census

As of the 2020 United States census, there were 2,212 people, 1,060 households, and 748 families residing in the city.

2000 census
At the 2000 census there were 2,192 people in 855 households, including 582 families, in the city. The racial makeup of the city was 96.66% White, 1.24% Black or African American, 0.09% Native American, 0.27% Asian, 0.05% Pacific Islander, 0.87% from other races, and 0.82% from two or more races.  1.51% of the population were Hispanic or Latino of any race and 00.01% Other.
Of the 855 households 29.0% had children under the age of 18 living with them, 49.8% were married couples living together, 15.4% had a female householder with no husband present, and 31.9% were non-families. 29.5% of households were one person and 15.2% were one person aged 65 or older.  The average household size was 2.33 and the average family size was 2.84.

The age distribution was 25.1% under the age of 18, 9.9% from 18 to 24, 24.9% from 25 to 44, 22.6% from 45 to 64, and 17.5% 65 or older.  The median age was 37 years. For every 100 females, there were 90.4 males.  For every 100 females age 18 and over, there were 83.8 males.

The median household income was $19,862 and the median family income  was $24,274. Males had a median income of $20,767 versus $18,461 for females. The per capita income for the city was $13,813.  About 42.6% of families and 42.6% of the population were below the poverty line, including 26.5% of those under age 18 and 25.6% of those age 65 or over.

Education 

Public education for elementary and secondary school students is available from the Harrisburg School District, which leads to graduation from Harrisburg High School.

Notable person
John K. Hutchison, Republican member of the Arkansas House of Representatives from District 52 from 2013 to 2015, resident of Harrisburg; unseated by Dwight Tosh of Jonesboro

Mickey Ryan, Former Associate AD of Arkansas State University: Host of Blaine & Mickey from 1 to 3pm in Nashville TN, Pre-game Host For Tennessee Titans Radio, and a very accomplished bass player: Former resident of Harrisburg

References

Cities in Poinsett County, Arkansas
Cities in Arkansas
County seats in Arkansas
Jonesboro metropolitan area